Kévin Diaz (born 18 August 1988) is a French professional footballer who plays as a midfielder for FC Istres.

Career
Diaz joined the principality-based side AS Monaco in 2002. He was officially promoted to the first-team for the 2008–09 Ligue 1 season and made his debut on 30 August 2008 in a 1–0 loss against Grenoble coming on as a substitute. On 21 July 2009, AC Ajaccio announced that they had signed the midfielder on loan from Monaco for the entire season. After two consecutive seasons with FC Metz on loan, he completed move to OGC Nice, signing a one-year contract with the option of two years.

In August 2013, he signed a two-year deal with Tours in Ligue 2.

In July 2015, Diaz signed for newly promoted side Red Star F.C.

References

External links
 
 
 
 
 

Living people
1988 births
Association football midfielders
French footballers
French people of Spanish descent
AS Monaco FC players
AC Ajaccio players
FC Metz players
OGC Nice players
Tours FC players
Red Star F.C. players
FC Istres players
Ligue 1 players
Ligue 2 players
People from Istres
Sportspeople from Bouches-du-Rhône
Footballers from Provence-Alpes-Côte d'Azur